HJS Akatemia is a football club from Hämeenlinna, Finland. Their home ground is Kaurialan kenttä. The men's football first team currently plays in the Kakkonen (the third highest level of football in Finland).

Current squad

Management

References

External links

Football clubs in Finland
Hämeenlinna
Association football clubs established in 2015
2015 establishments in Finland